Noah Andre Trudeau (born February 23, 1949) is an American historian who has written books and produced programs for National Public Radio.

Life 
Trudeau was born on February 23, 1949, the son of two World War II veterans. He studied history at the State University of New York at Albany.
Trudeau was formerly an executive producer at National Public Radio.

In addition to his books, Trudeau has written a number of articles for military history magazines such as Civil War Times Illustrated, Gettysburg Magazine, Blue and Gray, North & South, The Columbiad, America's Civil War and Military History Quarterly.

Awards 
Trudeau’s first book Bloody Roads South won the Civil War Round Table of New York's Fletcher Pratt Award.
He was also awarded the Jerry Coffey Memorial Book Prize offered by the Grady McWhiney Research Foundation.
In June 2012, Trudeau’s essay in Military History Quarterly won the Army Historical Foundation’s 2011 Distinguished Writing Award.

Publications 
 Bloody Roads South: the Wilderness to Cold Harbor, May–June 1864. Boston: Little, Brown, 1989. . 
 The Last Citadel: Petersburg, Virginia, June 1864-April 1865. Boston: Little, Brown, 1991. . 
 Out of the Storm: the End of the Civil War, April–June 1865. Boston: Little, Brown, 1994. . 
 Voices of the 55th: Letters from the 55th Massachusetts Volunteers, 1861-1865. Dayton, Ohio: Morningside, 1996. . 
 Like Men of War: Black Troops in the Civil War, 1862-1865. Boston: Little, Brown, 1998. . 
 Gettysburg: A Testing of Courage. New York: HarperCollins, 2002. . 
 Robert E. Lee: Lessons in Leadership. New York: Palgrave Macmillan, 2009. . 
 Southern Storm: Sherman's March to the Sea. New York: Harper, 2008. . 
 Lincoln’s Greatest Journey: Sixteen Days that Changed a Presidency, March 24—April 8, 1865.  Savas Beatie, 2016.

References

External links
Lincoln 1865, Trudeau's project to learn more about the last weeks of Abraham Lincoln's life

Living people
1949 births
American military historians
American male non-fiction writers
Historians of the American Civil War